The bamboo flute, especially the bone flute, is one of the oldest musical instruments known. Examples of Paleolithic bone flutes have survived for more than 40,000 years, to be discovered by archaeologists. While the oldest flutes currently known were found in Europe, Asia too has a long history with the instrument that has continued into the present day. In China, a playable bone flute was discovered, about 9000 years old.

Historians have found the bamboo flute has a long history as well, especially China and India. Flutes made history in records and artworks starting in the Zhou dynasty. The oldest written sources reveal the Chinese were using the kuan (a reed instrument) and hsio (or xiao, an end-blown flute, often of bamboo) in the 12th-11th centuries b.c., followed by the chi (or ch'ih) in the 9th century b.c. and the yüeh in the 8th century b.c.  Of these, the chi is the oldest documented cross flute or transverse flute, and was made from bamboo. The Chinese have a word, zhudi, which literally means "bamboo flute."

The cross flute (Sanscrit: vāṃśī) was "the outstanding wind instrument of ancient India," according to Curt Sachs. He said that religious artwork depicting "celestial music" instruments was linked to music with an "aristocratic character." The Indian bamboo cross flute, Bansuri, was sacred to Krishna, and he is depicted in Hindu art with the instrument. In India, the cross flute appeared in reliefs from the 1st century a.d. at Sanchi and Amaravati from the 2nd-4th centuries a.d.

In the modern age, bamboo flutes are common in places with ready access to bamboo, including Asia, South and Southeast Asia, South America, and Africa.

See: Chinese flutes

End blown flute mouthpieces

List of bamboo flutes, cane flutes, reed flutes
This list is intended to show flutes made of bamboo. It excludes pan flutes or panpipes, and flutes and whistles that don't have finger positions to change notes. It also excludes pipes that use reeds to produce the sound. Bamboo is a grass, and some "cane" or "reed" flutes may get listed here, as long as the plant is being used for a tube that is blown into or across to create noise. Types of flutes include transverse flutes (also called cross flutes),  end-blown flutes (ring flutes are included with these) and Nose flutes. Fipple flutes, also called duct flutes, may be added to the list as well, as long as they are bamboo-based instruments. The bamboo variant may be added for instruments that include wood and bamboo versions.

References

Flutes
Bamboo flutes